In physics, particularly in quantum field theory, configurations of a physical system that satisfy classical equations of motion are called "on the mass shell" or simply more often on shell; while those that do not are called "off the mass shell", or off shell.

In quantum field theory, virtual particles are termed off shell because they do not satisfy the energy–momentum relation; real exchange particles do satisfy this relation and are termed on shell (mass shell). In classical mechanics for instance, in the action formulation, extremal solutions to the variational principle are on shell and the Euler–Lagrange equations give the on-shell equations. Noether's theorem regarding differentiable symmetries of physical action and conservation laws is another on-shell theorem.

Mass shell

Mass shell is a synonym for mass hyperboloid, meaning the hyperboloid in energy–momentum space describing the solutions to the equation:

,

the mass–energy equivalence formula which gives the energy  in terms of the momentum  and the rest mass  of a particle. In the literature, one may also encounter  if the metric signature used is (−,+,+,+).

The four-momentum   of the virtual particle is the difference between the four-momenta of the incoming and outgoing particles.

Virtual particles corresponding to internal propagators in a Feynman diagram are in general allowed to be off shell, but the amplitude for the process will diminish depending on how far off shell they are. This is because the -dependence of the propagator is determined by the four-momenta of the incoming and outgoing particles. The propagator typically has singularities on the mass shell.

When speaking of the propagator, negative values for  that satisfy the equation are thought of as being on shell, though the classical theory does not allow negative values for the energy of a particle.  This is because the propagator incorporates into one expression the cases in which the particle carries energy in one direction, and in which its antiparticle carries energy in the other direction; negative and positive on-shell  then simply represent opposing flows of positive energy.

Scalar field 

An example comes from considering a scalar field in D-dimensional Minkowski space. The action

The Euler–Lagrange equation for this action can be found by varying the field and its derivative and setting the variation to zero, and is:

Now, consider an infinitesimal  spacetime translation . The Lagrangian density  is a scalar, and so will infinitesimally transform as  under the infinitesimal transformation. On the other hand, by Taylor expansion, we have in general

This is an example of equation that holds off shell, since it is true for any fields configuration regardless of whether it respects the equations of motion (in this case, the Euler–Lagrange equation given above). However, we can derive an on shell equation by simply substituting the Euler–Lagrange equation:

We can write this as:

This is an instance of Noether's theorem. Here, the conserved quantity is the stress–energy tensor, which is only conserved on shell, that is, if the equations of motion are satisfied.

References

Quantum field theory